Lepanto may refer to:

Places 
 Lepanto, Greece, medieval Italian name of Nafpaktos
 Battle of Lepanto, 1571
 Lepanto, Arkansas, United States
 Lepanto, a sub-province in the former province of Lepanto-Bontoc, Philippines (now part of Mankayan, Benguet)
 Lepanto (Rome Metro),  an underground station
 Mount Lepanto, Antarctica

Ships 
 Italian ironclad Lepanto
 Italian minelayer Lepanto
 Spanish cruiser Lepanto
 Spanish destroyer Lepanto (1930-1957)
 Spanish destroyer SPS Lepanto (D21) (1957-1985), formerly USS Capps (DD-550)

Other uses
 Lepanto (poem), a poem by English poet G. K. Chesterton about the 1571 Battle of Lepanto
 Lepanto opening, in the board game Diplomacy

See also
 Battle of Lepanto (disambiguation)